Jetřichovice is a municipality and village in Děčín District in the Ústí nad Labem Region of the Czech Republic. It has about 400 inhabitants. The folk architecture in the village of Vysoká Lípa is well preserved and is protected by law as a village monument zone.

Administrative parts
Villages of Rynartice, Všemily and Vysoká Lípa are administrative parts of Jetřichovice.

Gallery

References

Villages in Děčín District
Bohemian Switzerland